Masindi Airport  is an airport in Uganda.

Location
Masindi Airport is in the Kyema suburb of the town of Masindi, Masindi District, Bunyoro sub-region, in the Western Region.

See also

 List of airports in Uganda
 Transport in Uganda
 Civil Aviation Authority of Uganda

References

External links
 Location of Masindi Airport At Google Maps
 Masindi pilot info
 Website of Uganda Civil Aviation Authority

Airports in Uganda
Masindi District
Western Region, Uganda